The men's mass start in the 2013–14 ISU Speed Skating World Cup was contested over two races on two occasions, out of a total of six World Cup occasions for the season, with the first occasion involving the event taking place in Inzell, Germany, on 7–9 March 2014, and the second occasion taking place in Heerenveen, Netherlands, on 14–16 March 2014. The races were over 20 laps.

Bob de Vries of the Netherlands won the cup, while fellow Dutchman, the defending champion Arjan Stroetinga, came second, and Bart Swings of Belgium came third.

Top three

Race medallists

Standings 
Standings as of 14 March 2014 (end of the season).

References 

 
Men mass start